The Snake-witch, Snake-charmer or Smiss stone is a picture stone found at Smiss, När socken, Gotland, Sweden.

History 
Discovered in a cemetery, it measures  in height and depicts a figure holding a snake in each hand. Above the figure there are three interlaced creatures (forming a triskelion pattern) that have been identified as a boar, an eagle, and a wolf. The stone has been dated to 400–600 AD. The scholars call it the "Snake-witch".

Parallels, interpretations, and speculation 
The figure on the stone was first described by Sune Lindquist in 1955. He tried unsuccessfully to find connections with accounts in Old Icelandic sources, and he also compared the stone with the Snake Goddess from Crete. Lindquist found connections with the late Celtic Gundestrup cauldron, although he appears to have overlooked that the cauldron also shows a figure holding a snake.

Arrhenius and Holmquist (1960) also found a connection with late Celtic art suggesting that the stone depicted Daniel in the lions' den and compared it with a depiction on a purse lid from Sutton Hoo, although the stone in question does not show creatures with legs. Arwidsson (1963) also attributed the stone to late Celtic art and compared it with the figure holding a snake on the Gundestrup cauldron. In a later publication Arrhenius (1994) considered the figure not to be a witch but a magician and she dated it to the Vendel Period, although men are called witches also, and the legs spread clearly identifies this as a female, making her a witch who was a magician. Hauk (1983), who is a specialist on bracteates, suggested that the stone depicts Odin in the fetch of a woman, while Görman (1983) has proposed that the stone depicts the Celtic god Cernunnos.

It also has been connected to a nearby stone relief on a doorjamb at Väte Church on Gotland which shows a woman who suckles two dragons, but this was made five centuries later than the picture stone.

Snake symbolism 
Snakes were popular as a motif on later picture stones which show snake pits, used as a painful means of execution; this form of punishment also is known through Norse sagas. Snakes are considered to have had an important symbolism during the passage from paganism to Germanic Christianity. They were frequently combined with images of deer, crustaceans, or supernatural beasts. The purpose may have been to protect the stones and to deter people who might destroy them.

See also 
Hyrrokkin, a giantess in Norse mythology who uses snakes as reins

Notes

References 
Hermodsson, L. 2000. "En invandrad gud? Kring en märklig gotländsk bildsten. (An alien god?)". Fornvännen 95. Stockholm.
Nylén, E. & Lamm, J.P. (1988). Stones, Ships and Symbols. Gidlunds bokförlag, Stockholm. 

Rune- and picture stones on Gotland
5th-century inscriptions
6th-century inscriptions